Plamen Krumov (born 23 January 1975) is a Bulgarian football forward.

He played as a striker for OFC Zagorets, Sliven, Maritsa, CSKA Sofia, Botev Plovdiv, Spartak Varna, Naftex and Chernomorets on left and right attack. Krumov was signed with Chernomorets in January 2009 for a free transfer from Naftex Burgas. From 2010 to 2011 he was the director of Chernomorets Burgas's youth academy.

Career
Krumov started his career in his home town Sliven on the local team PFC Sliven. After that he played for Maritsa Plovdiv, CSKA Sofia, Botev Plovdiv, Spartak Varna, PFC Naftex Burgas and Chernomorets. On 16 May 2010, he ended his career against CSKA Sofia 2-0. In August 2014, Krumov came out of retirement to play for Chernomorets Burgas in the B PFG.

References

1973 births
Living people
Bulgarian footballers
First Professional Football League (Bulgaria) players
PFC CSKA Sofia players
Botev Plovdiv players
PFC Spartak Varna players
Neftochimic Burgas players
PFC Chernomorets Burgas players
Association football forwards
Sportspeople from Sliven